Denis Franskevich (born June 6, 1981 in Karaganda, Kazakh SSR, USSR) is a Kazakhstani-Russian professional ice hockey goaltender who currently plays for Rubin Tyumen of the Higher Hockey League (VHL).

External links

1981 births
Living people
Kazakhstani ice hockey players
Russian ice hockey goaltenders
Avtomobilist Yekaterinburg players
Saryarka Karagandy players
HC Neftekhimik Nizhnekamsk players
Barys Nur-Sultan players
Sportspeople from Karaganda